is a Japanese television series that aired on Fuji Television in 2004. The drama is based on the novel Gege by Masashi Sada.

Cast
 Miho Kanno as Shiki Tomokawa
 Naohito Fujiki as Shunsuke Azumi
 Misaki Ito as Ai Asakura
 Hiroshi Tamaki as Shingo Orihara
 Mirai Moriyama as Mitsuo Tomokawa
 Tomoka Kurotani as Asako Takaizumi
 Kenichi Yajima as Yukihiko Ogasawara
 Kaoru Yachigusa as Yoshie Azumi
 Shigeru Izumiya as Tetsuo Tomokawa
 Saburō Tokitō as Keisuke Furuya
 Masato Irie
 Ruri Matsuo
 Saki Aibu
 Mirai Shida (episode 3)
 Natsumi Yamada (episode 6)

Episodes
 Love is something you never stop working for
 A forgotten item
 The fate of a love too painful
 Rain of tears
 To Nagasaki
 Your hometown
 Love is not regretting
 Father's Day present
 Dear Mother
 Shock
 The last thing I want you to see

References

External links

See also
 List of Japanese television dramas
 Fuji Television

Japanese drama television series
2004 Japanese television series debuts
2004 Japanese television series endings
Fuji TV dramas
Television shows written by Yûji Sakamoto
Television shows based on Japanese novels